The Post Office Tree (Afrikaans: Poskantoorboom) is a famous milkwood tree (Sideroxylon inerme) in Mosselbay, South Africa that was used by early Portuguese explorers as a post office. It is located in the grounds of the Bartholomeu Dias Museum Complex in Market Street.

History
In 1501, Portuguese navigator Pêro de Ataíde sought shelter in Mossel Bay after losing much of his fleet in a storm.  He left an account of the disaster hidden in an old shoe which he suspended from a milkwood tree (Sideroxylon inerme) near the spring from which explorer Bartolomeu Dias had drawn water. The report was found by the explorer to whom it was addressed, João da Nova, and the tree served as a kind of de facto post office for decades thereafter. João da Nova erected a small shrine near the Post Office Tree, and although no traces of it remain, it is considered the first place of Christian worship in South Africa.

More recently, a boot-shaped post box has been erected under the now famous tree, and letters posted there are franked with a commemorative stamp. This has ensured that the tree has remained one of the town’s biggest tourist attractions.

See also
List of individual trees
List of Champion Trees (South Africa)

References

 

Monuments and memorials in South Africa
Individual trees in South Africa
History of Mosselbay